Neomegalonema perideroedes is a filamentous bacterium from the genus of Neomegalonema which has been isolated from activated bulking sludge from industrial wastewater in Grindsted in Denmark.

References

Further reading

External links
Type strain of Meganema perideroedes at BacDive -  the Bacterial Diversity Metadatabase

 

Rhodobacterales
Bacteria described in 2006